Thomas de Foix-Lescun (died 3 March 1525), commonly known as Lescun, was  a French commander during the Italian War of 1521, and the brother of Odet de Foix, Vicomte de Lautrec, André de Foix, Lord of Lesparre and Françoise de Foix.

He accompanied King Francis I of France in the conquest of the Duchy of Milan. He helped Pope Leo X in the conquest of the Duchy of Urbino and in 1518 he was made Marshal of France. As the French governor of Milan, his severe rule gained him the people's enmity, and he had to retreat to Parma until the arrival of his brother.

At the Battle of Bicocca, he commanded the cavalry force which attempted to flank Prospero Colonna; afterwards, he assumed command of the French army and was wounded. Later he was responsible for the French withdrawal from Italy.

He fought in the battle of Pavia, being wounded while he was rescuing King Francis I. He was made prisoner and subsequently died out of his wounds.

References
 Oman, Charles. A History of the Art of War in the Sixteenth Century.  London: Methuen & Co., 1937.

1525 deaths
Military leaders of the Italian Wars
Year of birth unknown